Chucky is an American horror television series created by Don Mancini and based on the Child's Play film franchise. It serves as a sequel to Cult of Chucky, the seventh film in the franchise, and stars Brad Dourif reprising his role as the voice of the titular character, alongside Zackary Arthur, Alyvia Alyn Lind, Teo Briones, and Björgvin Arnarson. The cast also includes Fiona Dourif, Alex Vincent, Christine Elise, Jennifer Tilly, and Billy Boyd reprising their roles from previous films.

Developed for Syfy and USA Network, the series follows Chucky as he commits a series of mysterious murders in a quiet city in the United States. Series creator Mancini and producer David Kirschner both serve as executive producers for the series, alongside Nick Antosca, Harley Peyton and Alex Hedlund. The series premiered simultaneously on Syfy and the USA Network on October 12, 2021. It has received generally positive reviews from critics. In November 2021, the series was renewed for a second season which premiered on October 5, 2022.  In January 2023, the series was renewed for a third season, which is tentatively set to debut in 2023.

Plot 
The beginning of the series is set three weeks after the events of Cult of Chucky. In the city of Hackensack, New Jersey, 14-year-old Jake Wheeler buys a Good Guy doll at a yard sale to use it in his contemporary art project during the Halloween season. He later discovers that the doll is possessed by the soul of serial killer Charles Lee Ray, known as Chucky. Jake soon becomes a suspect in a series of strange events involving the doll, who unleashes a wave of shocking murders around the town. Some of the boy's classmates will also see themselves linked to these events. In addition, a series of flashbacks explore Charles's past as a seemingly normal kid who somehow became one of Hackensack's most notorious killers.

Starring mostly teenagers and advertised as a "coming of rage" story, the series tackles themes of sexuality, bullying, domestic life and murder. The main character, Jake Wheeler, finds himself prompted to homicidal acts by the doll while also struggling with his crush on classmate Devon and other issues that arise from being gay in unaccepting environments.

Cast and characters

Main
 Zackary Arthur as Jake Wheeler, a teenager who purchases Chucky at a yard sale and is then menaced by him. After killing his father, Chucky attempts to convince Jake to kill his bully, Lexy. However, he goes against Chucky and instead works with her and Devon, his crush turned boyfriend, to take down Chucky.
 Björgvin Arnarson as Devon Evans, Jake's classmate who hosts a true crime podcast and frequently speaks about Charles Lee Ray. Later, he becomes Jake's boyfriend.
 Alyvia Alyn Lind as Lexy Cross, Jake's classmate, who starts out as a school bully, but becomes friends with him and Devon after being attacked by Chucky and learning he is alive.
 Teo Briones as Junior Wheeler (season 1), Jake's antagonistic cousin and Lexy's ex-boyfriend who is forced into track by his dad.
 Brad Dourif as the voice of Chucky / Charles Lee Ray, a vicious serial killer who, before dying, transferred his soul into a "Good Guy" doll.

Recurring
 Lexa Doig as Bree Wheeler (season 1), Jake's aunt, Junior's mother, Logan's wife, and Lucas’ sister-in-law who has kept a secret from her family.
 Barbara Alyn Woods as Mayor Michelle Cross (season 1; guest, season 2), Lexy's mother, Hackensack's mayor, and a would-be TikTok star.
 Michael Therriault as Nathan Cross (season 1), Lexy's father, and Michelle's husband. Therriault previously portrayed Dr. Foley in Cult of Chucky.
 Rachelle Casseus as Kim Evans (season 1), Devon's mother, and a Hackensack detective who is suspicious of Jake, but later comes around to him after he begins dating Devon.
 Carina London Battrick as Caroline Cross (season 1; guest, season 2), Lexy's younger sister who is befriended by Chucky.
 David Kohlsmith as young Charles Lee Ray as 7 years old (season 1; guest, season 2)
 Devon Sawa as:
 Lucas Wheeler (guest, season 1), Jake's father, Junior's uncle, Logan’s twin brother, and Bree's brother-in-law, who only appears in the first episode.
 Logan Wheeler (season 1), Jake's uncle, Junior's father, Lucas’ twin brother, and Bree's husband.
 Father Bryce (season 2), the headmaster at the Catholic School of the Incarnate Lord.
 Chucky / Charles Lee Ray (guest, season 2), a vicious serial killer who briefly possesses the body of Father Bryce.
 Fiona Dourif as:
 Nica Pierce, a paraplegic woman who, since the events of Cult of Chucky, has been possessed by Chucky.
 Chucky / Charles Lee Ray, a vicious serial killer who possessed the body of Nica Pierce. Dourif also portrays Charles Lee Ray in 1980s flashbacks, with Brad Dourif providing his voice.
 Jennifer Tilly as:
 Tiffany Valentine, Chucky's lover and partner in crime who possessed the body of actress Jennifer Tilly.
 Tilly also voices her doll form that originated in Bride of Chucky.
 Jennifer Tilly (voice, season 2), An actress whose body Tiffany has possessed, whose soul was transferred into a doll.
 Christine Elise as Kyle, Andy's foster sister.
 Alex Vincent as Andy Barclay, Chucky's original owner and archenemy, who has been tormented by him since 1988.
 Tyler Barish as young Charles Lee Ray as 14 years old (guest, season 1; guest, season 2) 
 Blaise Crocker as young Tiffany Valentine (season 1), from 1980s flashbacks.
 Rosemary Dunsmore as:
 Dr. Amanda Mixter, Bree's and the Cross' therapist, who has connections to Chucky.
 Chucky / Charles Lee Ray (season 2), a vicious serial killer who possessed the body of Dr. Mixter.
 Annie M. Briggs as Ms. Fairchild (season 1; guest, season 2), the school's biology teacher, who is wrongly accused of the murders committed by Chucky.
 Lara Jean Chorostecki as Sister Ruth (season 2), a nun at the Catholic School of the Incarnate Lord.
 Bella Higginbotham as Nadine (season 2), Lexy's roommate at the Catholic School of the Incarnate Lord.
 Andrea Carter as Sister Catherine (season 2), a nun and teacher at the Catholic School of the Incarnate Lord.
 Lachlan Watson as:
 Glen Tilly (season 2), Chucky and Tiffany's non-binary child, who doesn't like violence, and refrains from killing. Watson replaces Beans El-Balawi as Glen's human body.
 Glenda Tilly (season 2), Chucky and Tiffany's non-binary child, who has more violent tendencies, and is willing to kill. Watson replaces Kristina Hewitt as Glenda's human body.

Special guest stars
 Gina Gershon as herself (season 2)
 Liv Morgan as herself (season 2)
 Joe Pantoliano as himself (season 2)
 Sutton Stracke as herself (season 2)
 Meg Tilly as herself (season 2)
 Billy Boyd as the voice of G.G. Valentine (season 2), the combined minds of Glen and Glenda in doll form. Boyd reprises his role from Seed of Chucky.

Episodes

Series overview

Season 1 (2021)

Season 2 (2022)

Production

Development

On January 29, 2019, it was reported that a television series based on the Child's Play franchise was in development on Syfy, with Don Mancini serving as the creator. Mancini was also expected to serve as executive producer alongside David Kirschner, Harley Peyton, and Nick Antosca. On January 11, 2020, during NBCUniversal's presentation at the TCA Winter Press Tour in Pasadena, California, it was announced that Syfy had given the production a straight-to-series order, in a deal with Universal Content Productions. While working on the show, Mancini was concerned about the potential impact the 2019 Child's Play reboot could have had in the franchise, speculating that, had it been a success, Universal Pictures could have decided to abandon the original film's continuity. However, the reboot film (made without Mancini's approval) did not affect the TV show, and a sequel has not been produced.

Mancini, who began working for television on the Hannibal series, wanted to "reinvent" the Chucky franchise by bringing it to this format, and subsequently expand its fandom. He took a somewhat autobiographical approach to Jake's character, a gay teenager whose father is not accepting of the boy's "burgeoning sexual and romantic identity". The director cites this conflict as referential to his own adolescence. The show is a direct sequel to Cult of Chucky (2017), where the cliffhanger ending puts the titular character "on the road to a sexual exploration" after he transfers his soul to a female body. As an innovation for the character, Chucky is also used as a metaphor of the real life bully, guising himself to be "charming [and] funny" and manipulating people, what Mancini called "the ultimate bully". By making him close to Jake, whose struggles are related to those of the LGBT community, the series also acknowledges that "Chucky himself has a queer kid" (Glen/Glenda, from Seed of Chucky). According to Decider's Jon O'Brien, "queer characters have been a Child's Play mainstay ever since Bride of Chucky'''s ill-fated David (Gordon Michael Woolvett) back in 1998", but this series marks the first time they have such a prominent presence. However, Mancini stated that Chucky "is just a psychopath" and "will kill anybody", despite posing as Jake's ally.

Mancini wrote all eight episodes of the first season along with a team of writers, and directed the first episode. For Chucky, he was allowed to use the word "fuck" a maximum of ten times per episode, since he considers it an elemental aspect of the character. With eight hours to explore different sides of the story, Mancini saw the opportunity to elucidate the killer's past and answer questions that fans had been asking, like who his first victim was and how he met his bride Tiffany. Regarding the concept of multiple Chuckys, he explained that there are different versions of the character rather than a collective mind, something that also had its origin in Cult of Chucky.

On November 29, 2021, USA Network and Syfy renewed the series for a second season. Mancini began working on the first script in December and told Gizmodo that "a lot of the characters that fans love" might reappear in the second season. This was further commented by Jennifer Tilly, who  foresaw the return of Glen/Glenda. Despite being disappointed by the initial reception of Seed of Chucky, Mancini was glad that this character was later embraced by queer fans of the franchise, which motivated him to expand their story in season two. Also inspired by Catholic-based horror films like The Exorcist and The Omen, he set the second season on a Catholic reform school, thinking that it would be troublesome for Jake and Devon's relationship to keep unfolding in an environment that is not "exactly down with the gays". This also draws from Mancini's youth, since he grew up under the beliefs of the Catholic Church. He also stated that, at this point, making the show had become "cathartic", and that he began to exploit "specific actors' strengths and interests" with his writing (for example, Björgvin Arnarson's comedic side). The season also marks the reintroduction of the "Wedding Belle" doll, an item from Bride of Chucky that Mancini had been planning to reuse "for quite a while".

On January 15, 2023, Syfy renewed the series for a third season, which is tentatively set to debut in 2023.

Casting

The first teaser for the show, released on July 15, 2020, revealed that Brad Dourif would again provide the voice of Chucky. He initially recorded his dialogues at home, working remotely with Don Mancini. Between March and April of the following year, many other actors already linked to the franchise were confirmed to have recurring roles, including Jennifer Tilly as Tiffany Valentine, Alex Vincent as Andy Barclay, Christine Elise as Kyle, and Fiona Dourif as Nica Pierce. Fiona also plays an adult version of Charles Lee Ray, but her voice was replaced with Brad's in post-production. A reason for this was that Nica sounded too similar when possessed by Charles, which would have been "confusing" for the audience. All these actors renewed their contract for the second season between April and May 2022.

Devon Sawa was cast to play the roles of twins Lucas and Logan Wheeler, while Barbara Alyn Woods and Lexa Doig took the roles of Michelle Cross and Bree Wheeler, respectively. Four teenage actors star in the series: Zackary Arthur as Jake, Teo Briones as Junior, Alyvia Alyn Lind as Lexy, and Björgvin Arnarson as Devon. Arthur, whose parents did not let him watch R-rated movies as a kid, had his first introduction to the saga in preparation for his role. Arnarson told Screen Rant that, near the end of shooting, Mancini told him that he wished he had written a slightly different version of his character, and maybe make him interested in stand-up comedy. In regards to Lexy, who evolves from the "classic mean girl" to someone who cares about others, Alyn Lind stated: "I just really wanted to make sure that she knew exactly what she wanted at all times [...] I wanted to make that switch very clear". In the second season they are joined by Bella Higginbotham, who described her character Nadine as "a light" in the Chucky franchise.

Woods reprises her role as Michelle in the second season, while Sawa returns as a new character, Father Bryce, the headmaster at the Catholic School of the Incarnate Lord. In June 2022, Lachlan Watson was cast as Glen and Glenda Ray, Chucky's twin children from Seed of Chucky. Mancini cast Watson in the dual role after meeting them during a virtual San Diego Comic-Con 2019 panel about transgender representation, when Watson was speaking about their trans character in Chilling Adventures of Sabrina. Expressing his desire to work with them and following conversations they had about Chucky led Mancini to see "what Glen and Glenda represent for him" in Watson. Gina Gershon, Joe Pantoliano, Sutton Stracke and Meg Tilly make guest appearances; they play themselves as part of Jennifer Tilly's inner circle in the episode "Death on Denial". WWE star Liv Morgan also appears in said episode; she had declared herself a lifelong Child's Play fan and was added to the script by Don Mancini.

Filming

Filming for the series was scheduled to start in the fall of 2020, but it was delayed due to the COVID-19 pandemic. Shooting for the first season officially began on March 29, 2021, and concluded on August 11, 2021, in Toronto, Ontario, Canada. The Square One parking lot in Mississauga was used as a "base camp" for the production team. Tony Gardner and Peter Chevako developed Chucky's look with the goal to make him look exactly like in Child's Play 2. This was because, from Mancini's standpoint, the first sequel seems to be the general fan favorite. It took group of six or seven puppeteers to make Chucky move, which represents 99.5% of the doll's actions, according to Mancini, who has expressed his preference to do things practically over using computer-generated images. Digital effects were only used to erase puppeteers from screen or any implements required by the animatronic, such as rods or cables. A child named Jacob sometimes performed as a double.

Mancini explained that there were "several Chuckys" on set to perform different activities, with roughly two props for each action, in order to make him talk, walk or achieve some elaborate shots. Teo Briones, who plays Junior Wheeler in the first season, explained that his death scene was executed with two of those different Chuckys: one to "rough around a little bit", and another that could move its mouth for the close-ups. He also remarked that those scenes showing interaction between the doll and the actors were significantly longer to shoot due to their complexity. On the other hand, the young adult aspect of the show is emphasized by "over-the-top, stylistic, grandiose, visual stuff", because, in Mancini's words, "that's how you experience things when you are a teenager. Everything is incredibly vivid".

Filming for the second season began on April 20, 2022, and concluded on August 29, 2022, in Toronto. This season sees the addition of Lachlan Watson as Glen and Glenda Ray, characters whose scenes had to be carefully planned into schedule, since each of them needed a different characterization that took an hour to complete at the hair and makeup department. Watson, who is a non-binary person and goes by gender-neutral pronouns, explained that the camera would be set and film them as Glenda, then they would change their costume and return to be filmed as Glen, with a ear piece that played the lines they had recorded previously. "When you're in that environment the timing has to be perfect. So that was a big learning curve", Watson said.

Music

Joseph LoDuca served as the series' composer, as he did in Curse of Chucky and Cult of Chucky. For the show, he read the scripts beforehand and waited until the scenes were filmed to figure out ways to add a fitting soundtrack. Piano chords are used sometimes throughout the first season as an accompaniment to Jake and Devon's relationship, since the latter is seen playing that same instrument in the first episode. LoDuca also utilized a detuned toy piano to symbolize Chucky's "feigned innocence" in the first season. A similar theme was used to imply "something more sinister" to what was happening in certain scenes. A different version of the Child's Play 2 theme can also be heard in scenes involving Chucky and Caroline. LoDuca described the score for Tiffany as "lush", which helps present her as a "classic Hollywood vamp", while the flashbacks showing how she and Charles Lee Ray became a couple have a "80's synth vibe". Likewise, the show features licensed music by groups and solo artists like Billie Eilish, Kim Petras, Electric Youth, The Go-Go's, Yeah Yeah Yeahs, Shaed, and Rob Zombie, amongst many others.

 Promotion and broadcast 

Advertised as a "coming of rage" story, Chucky premiered simultaneously on Syfy and USA Network on October 12, 2021. Prior to the premiere, both channels released several promotional posters and videos, including one where Chucky reenacts the trailer for the 1978 film Magic with his classic voodoo chant to Damballa. In June, Syfy presented the "Pride of Chucky" marathon, consisting of six of the seven films from Child's Play franchise, in celebration of the LGBTQ+ pride month. On October 8, Don Mancini, Zackary Arthur, Jennifer Tilly and Alex Vincent attended the New York Comic Con, where a "Good Guys" branded ice cream truck was displayed. A screening of the first episode was also held at the same event.

The series became available for streaming on Peacock after the season 1 finale on December 1, 2021. A week after the American premiere, Chucky premiered on Showcase in Canada on October 19, 2021. It is also available on Star+ for all of Latin America, 9Now in Australia, Mediaset Infinity in Italy and on Sky Max in the United Kingdom and Ireland.

The second season premiered on October 5, 2022. The first trailer, released online on July 23, was going to premiere at the Chucky panel at San Diego Comic-Con that same day, but the show's crew cancelled their attendance just days prior for unclear reasons. A second trailer was released by IGN on September 14, accompanied by a promotional poster that shows Chucky sitting on a golden throne that references the religious themes of the second season and past films. A sneak peek of the second episode was screened during the Chucky panel at New York Comic Con, on October 7.

Reception
Critical response
On Rotten Tomatoes, the first season holds an approval rating of 91% based on 34 critic reviews, with an average rating of 7/10. The website's critical consensus reads, "A bloody good time that benefits greatly from Brad Dourif's return, Chucky may not play well for non-fans, but franchise devotees will find its absurd humor and creative horror very much intact on the small screen." Metacritic gave the series a weighted average score of 70 out of 100 based on 10 critic reviews, indicating "generally favorable reviews".

Earlier reviews, which focused on the first four episodes that were sent to critics, commented on how the franchise was adapted to the television format. Alex McLevy from The A.V. Club said that the series "retains all of [Chucky's] penchant for grotesque kills and juvenile, acidic humor", and that "when the oddball mix of sensibilities works, [the show] can be daffily entertaining". Television critic Daniel Fienberg finds the franchise "more funny than scary", with this installment still leaning towards the latter; writing for The Hollywood Reporter, he affirmed that "the series delivers solidly" when it comes to displaying Chucky in action, although being "a tiny bit unnerving when it shows how humans interact with the doll". Allison Keene from Paste described it as "surprisingly warm in terms of its atmosphere and direction", whereas Steven Scaife from Slant called it a "funny, absurd series that engenders sympathy as well as shock", also stating: "It creates a world of malleable, alienated kids failed to varying degrees by their parents, and then it expresses the danger of what they find once they're pushed away".

On Rotten Tomatoes, the second season has an approval rating of 91% based on 11 reviews, with an average rating of 7/10. Reviewing the first two episodes that were sent to critics, Collider's Alyse Wax said that the show at first "just seems like standard everyday horrors", although being "fun" and "a delight". Slash Film's Jeff Ewing highlighted the way the three main actors (Arthur, Arnarson and Alyn Lind) play off each other's performances, since they are "more convincing together than apart".

Ratings
Within its first week, the show attracted a total of 4.4 million viewers, half of them being in the 18-49 demographic, according to Nielsen Media Research. It was one of the highest-rated premieres of 2021 in cable television. With the episodes later debuting on both Syfy and USA Network's official YouTube channels for free, Chucky also gathered 2.9 million views combined in the United States, by October 25. Although it was the second most in-demand new TV series in mid-November, the sixth episode saw a 10.9% decrease in viewership as the Christmas season approached. The seventh episode, "Twice the Grieving, Double the Loss", was watched by 0.348 million viewers on USA Network and 0.350 million on Syfy, meaning an increase in viewership compared to the previous episode. The first season ended with its eight episode and a smaller decrease in audience than the sixth, with 0.296 million viewers on Syfy and 0.313 million on USA Network.

The season two premiere was watched by 0.335 million viewers on Syfy and 0.320 million on USA Network. In the following two weeks, the show was watched by 4 million people. According to The Hollywood Reporter, Chucky'' was among the top 10 dramas in cable television among adults 18-49 in 2022.

Accolades

See also 
 List of television series based on films

References

External links 
 
 Official website (Syfy)
 Official website (USA Network)

2020s American horror television series
2020s American LGBT-related drama television series
2021 American television series debuts
American television shows featuring puppetry
English-language television shows
Gay-related television shows
Horror drama television series
Live action television shows based on films
Sentient toys in fiction
Syfy original programming
Television series about bullying
Television series about fictional serial killers
Television series about teenagers
Television series by Universal Content Productions
Television shows filmed in Toronto
Television shows set in New Jersey
USA Network original programming
2020s LGBT-related television series